At-Turaif is a historic district located in Al-Dir'iyah north-west of Riyadh which is regarded as one of the important political and historical sites in Saudi Arabia represented the capital of Saudi dynasty, it was the original home of the Saudi royal family and the country's first capital, from 1727 till the Ottomans sacking of the area in 1818.

History 
At-Turaif District was founded in the 15th century bearing an architectural style of Najdi; this historical site was inscribed in UNESCO World Heritage List on July 31, 2010.

The various palaces in this area with an oasis and the Najdi architectural and decorative style was one of the UNESCO criteria to list the district as a World Heritage site. Moreover, The At-Turaif District was the first historical center with a unifying power in the Arabian Peninsula. As in the mid-18th century, Al-Dir'iyah became the capital of an independent Arab State representing an important phase in the human settlement of the central Arabian peninsula.

Sacked by the Ottomans in 1818 in the Siege of Diriyah, abandoned in favour of Riyadh, the area remained deserted until 2000, when the Ad-Diriyah Development Authority was commissioned to carry out an impressive restoration project aimed at transforming this settlement, recognized as a World Heritage Site, but unknown to most, into an international tourist destination.

Historic palaces and monuments At-Turaif 
There are some Historic palaces and monuments in At-Turaif district include:

 Salwa Palace
 Saad bin Saud Palace
 The Guest House and At-Turaif Bath House
 Imam Mohammad bin Saud Mosque

At-Turaif restoration program 
In December 2018, Saudi Arabia launched a restoration program for At-Turaif historic district aimed at documenting the archaeological sites of the district and transforming it into an open museum.

The project comes as part of Saudi's tourism plan that aims at increasing the Saudi local tourism and apart if the Saudi Vision 2030.

Atturaif Living Museum (UNESCO World Heritage Site) received the ‘National Winner’ status in the Social, Cultural and Heritage Project of the Year category at the 2020 MEED Project Awards.

References 


Riyadh Province
World Heritage Sites in Saudi Arabia
Tourist attractions in Riyadh